Gilman Lake is a natural lake in South Dakota, in the United States.

Gilman Lake has the name of Gilman W. Smith, a railroad engineer.

References

Lakes of South Dakota
Lakes of Lake County, South Dakota